The Osceola Times Building is a historic commercial building at 112 North Poplar Street in downtown Osceola, Arkansas.  Built in 1901, this two story brick building is one of the oldest commercial structures in the city, and was a significant element in the development of "new" Osceola following the town's relocation to be closer to the railroad.  The Osceola Times is the oldest newspaper in Mississippi County.

The building was listed on the National Register of Historic Places in 1987.

See also
National Register of Historic Places listings in Mississippi County, Arkansas

References

External links
Osceola Times web site

Newspaper headquarters in the United States
Commercial buildings on the National Register of Historic Places in Arkansas
Buildings and structures completed in 1901
Osceola, Arkansas
National Register of Historic Places in Mississippi County, Arkansas
Individually listed contributing properties to historic districts on the National Register in Arkansas
1901 establishments in Arkansas
Mass media in Arkansas